Leesburg is an unincorporated community located within Maurice River Township in Cumberland County, New Jersey, United States. The area is served as United States Postal Service ZIP code 08327.

The land that later became the town of Leesburg in the late eighteenth century also was surveyed by John Worledge and John Budd in 1691. Similar to Dorchester, the first settlers to the area were most likely Swedish, though a town was not established until 1795 when John Lee, an Egg Harbor shipwright, founded Leesburg. In doing so, he and his brothers opened the first shipyard—and with it established the industrial destiny of constructing coastal vessels. In 1850 James Ward built a marine railway here to facilitate the repair of larger ships, which were attracted to Maurice River site because it was only six miles from the Delaware Bay.

Though Leesburg's economic base was primarily shipbuilding, two successful early twentieth-century industries were the Leesburg Packing Company, a cannery that seasonally employed 100 persons, and J. C. Fifield and Son, a fertilizer works. Today the only evidence of these industries is WHIBCO Inc., a sandmining company whose administrative offices occupy the buildings of the former Del Bay Shipyard

Bayside State Prison is located in Leesburg. In 1988 the prison was renamed to "Bayside State Prison" from "Leesburg State Prison." Some Leesburg residents stated dissatisfaction with the renaming since it was the only widely known aspect of the Leesburg community.

Demographics

Notable people
People who were born in, residents of, or otherwise closely associated with Leesburg include:
Thomas Lee (1780–1856), represented New Jersey at large in the United States House of Representatives from 1833 to 1837.

References

External links
Census 2000 Fact Sheet for ZIP Code Tabulation Area 08327 from the United States Census Bureau

Maurice River Township, New Jersey
Unincorporated communities in Cumberland County, New Jersey
Unincorporated communities in New Jersey